HMS Duke of Wellington was a 131-gun first-rate ship of the line of the Royal Navy. Launched in 1852, she was symptomatic of an era of rapid technological change in the navy, being powered both by sail and steam. An early steam-powered ship, she was still fitted with towering masts and trim square-set yards, and was the flagship of Sir Charles Napier.

Design and construction
First christened HMS Windsor Castle, she was the first of a class of four that represented the ultimate development of the wooden three-decker ship of the line which had been the mainstay capital ship in naval warfare for 200 years. She was originally ordered in 1841 to a design of Sir William Symonds, the Surveyor of the Navy, but was not laid down until May 1849 at Pembroke Dock by which time Symonds had resigned and the design had been modified by the Assistant Surveyor John Edye. At this stage the ship was still intended as a sailing vessel. Although the Royal Navy had been using steam power in smaller ships for three decades, it had not been adopted for ships of the line, partly because the enormous paddle-boxes required would have meant a severe reduction in the number of guns carried. This problem was solved by the adoption of the screw propeller in the 1840s. Under a crash programme announced in December 1851 to provide the navy with a steam-driven battlefleet, the design was further modified by the new Surveyor, Captain Baldwin Walker. The ship was cut apart in two places on the stocks in January 1852, lengthened by 30 feet (9.1 m) overall and given screw propulsion. She received the 780 hp engines designed and built by Robert Napier and Sons for the iron frigate Simoon, which had surrendered them on conversion to a troopship. The ship was launched on 14 September 1852. On that day the Duke of Wellington died, and she was subsequently re-named in his honour and provided with a new figurehead in the image of the duke.

Service history
When completed on 4 February 1853, HMS Duke of Wellington was, on paper at least, the most powerful warship in the world (and would remain so until the completion of the French Bretagne in 1855) and the largest yet built for the Royal Navy, twice the size of Nelson's Victory and with a far bigger broadside. She was 240 feet (73.1 m) long, displaced 5,892 tons, and carried 131 cannon, weighing a total of 382 tons and mainly firing 32 lb balls.

After service in the Western Squadron of the Channel Fleet, she was designated the flagship of the fleet that Vice-Admiral Sir Charles Napier was to lead to the Baltic on the outbreak of the war with Russia (later known as the Crimean War). Duke of Wellington served as his flagship throughout the Baltic campaign of 1854 and returned to the Baltic the following year as the flagship of Napier’s successor in the command, Rear-Admiral Richard Saunders Dundas, being present at the bombardment of Sveaborg.

Under trials on 11 April 1853 she had made 10.15 knots under steam, and she proved a magnificent sailing ship, but the second-hand engines turned out distinctly unsatisfactory, and the hurried conversion had compromised her structural strength; she thus saw no active service after the Crimean War and paid off in 1856. She served as guard ship of sailing ordinary at Devonport from 1860 to 1863, then as a receiving ship at Portsmouth from 1863, where she became a familiar and much-photographed sight, always described on postcards as "the flagship of Sir Charles Napier".  She replaced  as flagship of the Port Admiral at Portsmouth in 1869 (with Victory becoming her tender), firing salutes to passing dignitaries, such as Queen Victoria on her way to Osborne House. On 4 February 1879, a fire broke out at the fore of the ship. It was extinguished with the assistance of two tugs. She served as flagship for the Commander-in-Chief from 24 October 1884
to 1886 and for Victoria's birthday celebration and fleet review at Portsmouth in 1896 "dressed smartly for the occasion" (despite having been paid off on 31 March 1888).

Fate
The personnel stationed on her eventually moved into RN Barracks Portsmouth in 1903 and she was finally sold to be broken up in 1904.

Ship's timbers discovered on the Thames foreshore at Charlton have been identified as being from the Duke of Wellington.

Sister ships
Of her three sisters, all of which received more powerful machinery specially designed for them:
HMS Marlborough was completed to a modified design and served as flagship of the Mediterranean Fleet from 1858–64; thereafter she too was a receiving ship at Portsmouth, renamed Vernon II, surviving until broken up in 1924.
HMS Prince of Wales was completed to the same design as Marlborough in 1860 but saw no sea service; in 1869 she was renamed Britannia and became the stationary training ship for officer cadets on the River Dart.
HMS Royal Sovereign was completed to the same design as the Duke of Wellington but was cut down to the lower deck and converted in 1862-4 into the first British turret ship to try out the ideas of Captain Cowper Phipps Coles. She was fitted with four turrets mounting 9 inch muzzle-loading rifled guns. She was regarded as primarily experimental and her longest voyage was to Cherbourg in 1865 before becoming the tender to the gunnery school HMS Excellent. She was scrapped in 1885.

The Imperial Russian Navy built a ship of its own based on the Duke of Wellington, the Imperator Nikolai I.

References

Bibliography

External links

 
 Images of HMS Duke of Wellington in the collection of the National Maritime Museum
 http://www.pdavis.nl/ShowShip.php?id=2304

 

Ships of the line of the Royal Navy
Victorian-era ships of the line of the United Kingdom
1852 ships
Crimean War naval ships of the United Kingdom
Ships built in Pembroke Dock
Maritime incidents in February 1879